The École Nationale Supérieure des Industries Chimiques (ENSIC) is an Engineering School dedicated to Chemical Engineering in Nancy, France.

Ensic Nancy is one of the seven schools of the Institut National Polytechnique de Lorraine (INPL), France's largest technological university.

Creation
In October 1885, it was announced that the authorities were in favour of the creation of an institute of chemistry in Nancy.  This pulled together a variety of chemical activities in the University of Nancy, with the specific aim of instructing young men in the practical application of chemistry to industry and agriculture. The decree authorizing the creation of the Institute was made on 8 September 1887 and construction began in 1888. The first 6 students joined in 1889 and Albin Haller was appointed as director on 30 July 1890.  on 6 June 1892 it was formally inaugurated by the President of the Republic, Marie François Sadi Carnot.

Notable achievements
One of its early professors, Victor Grignard, obtained the Nobel Prize in Chemistry in 1912 for his invention of the organo-metallic compounds known as "Grignard's reagents". After the Second World War, ENSIC introduced to France chemical engineering principles developed in the English-speaking world.

The school created a foundation in December 2008 to support its activities, called Fondation ENSIC, with the participation of Arkema.

ENSIC Nancy in numbers
450 masters-level engineering students
200 internships in France and abroad
100 professors, assistant professors and CNRS researchers (permanent staff)
180 graduate students

Engineering programs
ENSIC Nancy offers two masters-level engineering degrees accredited by the Commission des titres d'ingénieur (France) and by the Institution of Chemical Engineers (UK).

" Ingénieur des Industries Chimiques" (I2C) three years after a 2-years preparatory program of intensive study.
" Ingénieur des Techniques de l'Industrie" (FITI) : cooperative industrial-academic training program in Chemical Engineering Technology

Continuing education
A 2-year program open to Chemical Engineering technicians with 3–5 years of professional experience.
60 selected topical-courses delivered by the ENSIC Continuing Education Center.

Research laboratories
2 Laboratories:
LCPM: Laboratoire de Chimie Physique des Réactions (Polymer Science and Macromolecular Physical Chemistry)
LRGP : Laboratoire de Réactions et Génie des Procédés

Research activities
Research Activities in the following fields:
Thermodynamics
Fluid mechanics
Chemical reaction engineering
Chemical kinetics and catalysis
Separation processes
Transport phenomena
Characterisation and synthesis of polymers
Modelling and process control
Chemical engineering in rheologically complex media
Formulation and product engineering
Bioorganic chemistry, biotechnology and bioengineering
Photochemistry and photophysics
Safety, health, energy and environment
Micro- and nanotechnology

References

External links
ENSIC website

Chemistry education
University of Lorraine
Universities and colleges in Nancy, France
Nancy
Educational institutions established in 1887
Buildings and structures in Meurthe-et-Moselle
1887 establishments in France